Plascon-Evans Paints Ltd v Van Riebeeck Paints (Pty) Ltd is an important case in South African law, particularly in the area of civil procedure and trade marks. 

This appeal from a decision in the Cape Provincial Division was heard in the Appellate Division by Corbett JA, Miller JA, Nicholas JA, Galgut AJA and Howard AJA on February 27, 1984, with judgment handed down on May 21, 1984. The appellant's attorneys were Spoor & Fisher, Pretoria, and Israel & A Sackstein, Bloemfontein. The respondent's attorneys were Scher Webner & Co, Cape Town, and Lovius, Block, Meltz, Steyn & Yazbek, Bloemfontein.

The court found that a qualification was necessary to the general rule regarding final interdicts in motion proceedings. Sometimes the denial by the respondent of a fact alleged by the applicant may not be such as to raise a real, genuine or bona fide dispute of fact. If the respondent in such a case has failed to apply for the deponents concerned to be called for cross-examination, and if the court is satisfied as to the inherent credibility of the applicant's averments, the court may decide the disputed fact in the applicant's favour, without hearing oral evidence. This has come to be known as the "Plascon-Evans rule." When factual disputes arise, therefore, relief should be granted only if the facts stated by the respondent, together with the admitted facts in the applicant's affidavits, justify the order. The court noted there may be exceptions to this general rule, as where the allegations or denials are so far-fetched that the court is justified in rejecting them on the papers.

It seemed to the court that the definition of "trade mark" in section 2 of the Trade Marks Act was not appropriate to infringement proceedings. It seemed also that the notional-user test, deployed by the courts to determine whether or not there has been an infringement of a trade mark, posed difficulties where the actual proven user fell outside of the ambit of the plaintiff's monopoly.

The court found that the intention of the legislature in section 46(b) of the Act was to safeguard the use by the trader of words which were fairly descriptive of his goods and genuinely used for the purpose of describing the character and quality of those goods. Such use must not be a device for the achievement of some ulterior object.

Judgment 
The rule was formulated in Stellenbosch Farmers' Winery Ltd v Stellenvale Winery (Pty) Ltd that, where there is a dispute as to the facts, a final interdict should be granted in motion proceedings only if the facts as stated by the respondents, together with the admitted facts in the applicant's affidavit, justify such an order, or where it is clear that the facts, although not formally admitted, cannot be denied and must be regarded as admitted.

The court in the present matter found that this required clarification and perhaps qualification. In certain cases the denial by the respondent of a fact alleged by the applicant may not be such as to raise a real, genuine or bona fide dispute of fact. If, in such a case, the respondent has not availed himself of his right to apply for the deponents concerned to be called for cross-examination under Rule 6(5)(g) of the Uniform Rules of Court, and the court is satisfied as to the inherent credibility of the applicant's factual averment, it may proceed on the basis of the correctness thereof and include this fact among those upon which it determines whether the applicant is entitled to the final relief which he seeks. There may be exceptions to this general rule, as where the allegations or denials of the respondent are so far-fetched or clearly untenable that the court is justified in rejecting them merely on the papers.

It appeared to the court that, when considering whether or not an alleged infringer of the rights of the proprietor of a registered trade mark had unauthorisedly used a mark "as a trade mark" within the meaning of section 44(1)(a) of the Trade Marks Act, in certain situations problems would arise in the application of the statutory definition of "trade mark" in section 2 of the Act. It also appeared that the application of the notional-user test to determine infringement of a trade mark posed certain difficulties. If the actual proven user by the defendant fell outside the ambit of the plaintiff's monopoly, it could not be said that a notional fair and normal user of his mark, which had not in fact occurred, would trespass upon the plaintiff's monopoly.

What the legislature intended to safeguard by means of the provisions of section 46 (b) of the Act was the use by a trader, in relation to his goods, of words, which are fairly descriptive of his goods, genuinely for the purpose of describing the character or quality of the goods. The use of the words must not be a mere device to secure some ulterior object, as for example where the words are used in order to take advantage of the goodwill attaching to the registered trade mark of another.

The court held in casu that the use by the respondent, a dealer in paints and allied products, of the name "Mikacote" was an infringement of appellant's (also a dealer in paints) registered trade mark consisting of the word "Micatex." The court held, furthermore, that the word "Mikacote" was not a word in ordinary use but a fancy name which was not a fair description of the character or quality of the paint which it sold and was accordingly not protected by the provisions of s 46 (b) of the Act.

The decision of the full bench of the Cape Provincial Division, in Van Riebeeck Paints (Pty) Ltd v Plascon-Evans Paints (Pty) Ltd, was thus overruled.

References

Books
S Peté and D Hulme Civil Procedure: A Practical Guide 2 ed (2011).
C Theophilopoulos et al Fundamental Principles of Civil Procedure 2 ed (2012).
The Law of South Africa. Butterworths. Durban. 1995. Volume 29. Paragraphs 47, 90, 215, 216 and 238 at pages 34, 48, 49, 105 and 106. Durban. 1997. Volume 3. Part 1. Paragraphs 27 and 151 at pages 21, 85 and 86. First Reissue. Durban. 2001. Volume 29. Paragraphs 39, 48, 91, 129, 216, 217, and 239 at pages 37, 42, 81, 58, 124 and 137. Second Edition. LexisNexis. Durban. 2010. Volume 20. Part 1. Paragraph 270 at page 277. LexisNexis Butterworths. Durban. 2005.Volume 7. Paragraph 259 at page 259.
Annual Survey of South African Law 2008. Page 945.
Annual Survey of South African Law 2007. Page 875.
Annual Survey of South African Law 2006. Page 763.
Annual Survey of South African Law 2005. Pages 708 and 717.
Johann Kriegler, "Criminal Procedure", Annual Survey of South African Law 2004, p 684 at p 686 See also page 143.
[2003] Annual Survey of South African Law 112, 198 and 840
[2002] Annual Survey of South African Law 868
[1999] Annual Survey of South African Law 333 and 520
Mervyn Dendy and Cheryl Loots, "Civil Procedure", Annual Survey of South African Law 1992
Cheryl Loots, "Civil Procedure", Annual Survey of South African Law 1991
A C Cilliers, "Civil Procedure", Annual Survey of South African Law 1988
A C Cilliers, "Civil Procedure", Annual Survey of South African Law 1984, p 493 at p 508.
Coenraad Visser, "Law of Patents, Designs, Trade Marks and Copyright", Annual Survey of South African Law 1984, p 404 at p 415.
The Supreme Court Act and the Magistrates' Courts Act and Rules. Juta. 2009. Pages 198 and 233.
The Civil Practice of the High Courts and the Supreme Court of Appeal of South Africa. Fifth Edition. Juta. 2009. Volume 2. Pages 1460, 1477, 1479 and 1513.
Mervyn Dendy (ed). The Civil Practice of the Supreme Court of South Africa. Fourth Edition. Juta. 1997. Pages 236, 240, 241, 388, 393, 1068 and 1080.
Mervyn Dendy. Civil Procedure Sibergramme Yearbook 2005. Siber Ink. 2006. Pages 41 to 43, 49 and 181.
J R De Ville. Judicial Review of Administrative Action in South Africa. LexisNexis Butterworths. 2005. Page 306.
R H Christie. The Law of Contract in South Africa. Third Edition. Butterworths. 1996. Page 589.
Brassey, Cameron, Cheadle and Olivier. The New Labour Law. Third Edition. Juta & Co Ltd. 1987. Page 201.
Edwin Cameron, Halton Cheadle and Clive Thompson. The New Labour Relations Act. Juta & Co Ltd. 1989. Page 237.
Albert Kruger. Organised Crime and Proceeds of Crime Law in South Africa. LexisNexis. 2008. Pages 121 and 157.
Lourens M du Plessis. The Interpretation of Statutes. Third Edition. Butterworths. 1986. Page 113.
Compendium of Judicial Decisions on Matters Related to Environment. National Decisions. Volume 1. Pages 103 and 106.
Ellison Kahn. The Quest for Justice. Juta & Co Ltd. 1995. Pages 58 and 271.
Coenraad Visser. The New Law of Trade Marks and Designs. Juta & Co  Ltd. 1995. Page 31.
L T C Harms. The Enforcement of Intellectual Property Rights: A Case Book. Third Edition. WIPO. 2012. Pages 105, 111, 121 and 123.
Malcolm Wallis. Associated Ship and South African Admiralty Jurisdiction. Siber Ink. 2010. Pages 196 and 295.
Peter Kantor. CCMA: A Commentary on the Rules. Fourth Edition. Siber Ink. 2015. Pages 58 and 154.
Dennis Campbell (ed) [2006] 28 Comparative Law Yearbook of International Business. 315.
The Lesotho Law Reports and Legal Bulletin. Law Society of Lesotho. 1999. Pages 21, 40 and 239.

Cases
 Plascon-Evans Paints Ltd v Van Riebeeck Paints (Pty) Ltd 1984 (3) SA 623 (A).
 ''Boschenmeer Master Home Owners' Association (common law association) v J C Carstens Luhan-Lune Family Trust & 7 Others 19August2014 - Cape Of Good Hope High Court

Notes 

2006 in South African law
2006 in case law
South African property case law
Supreme Court of Appeal of South Africa cases